Sleeping Beauty is a 1976 comedy album recorded by Cheech & Chong. Since 1976, this album was only available on vinyl LP and 8-track, then, in 1992 it was briefly reissued on CD and cassette and has since become out of print. On November 15, 2005, the long out-of-print album was finally re-released and digitally re-mastered on CD, along with Let's Make a New Dope Deal.

Cover
The album cover and title refer to the once popular drug  Secobarbital, a barbiturate derivative commonly known on the street as "reds".  Used for epilepsy and insomnia, the drug was widely abused in the 1960s and '70s.  The original LP album cover folded out into a giant red capsule, bearing a pharmaceutical code resembling that of  Secobarbital pills of the 1970s. The inner sleeve featured a photo of a "red" placed on a person's tongue. (This image was used as the cover art for the remastered CD.)  Many references to "reds" have been made on Cheech & Chong's albums and in their films.

Track listing

Charts

See also
Cheech & Chong

References

1976 albums
Cheech & Chong albums
Ode Records albums
Warner Records albums
1970s comedy albums